La criada de la granja is a 1953 Venezuelan telenovela broadcast on Televisa (currently known as Venevisión). It was starring by the Venezuelan actors José Torres, best known for his role Tacupay in the 1995 telenovela Ka Ina, and Aura Ochoa.

History 
La criada de la granja was the first telenovela that was filmed in Venezuela in the 50s. The telenovela had a duration of 15 minutes, and was broadcast weekly from Monday to Friday at 7 p.m on Televisa, currently known as Venevisión. At that time, each episode was filming live during the telenovela broadcast. Until later with the arrival of the video tape, the episodes could be recorded and subsequently broadcast. This telenovela was broadcast despite the dictatorship of Marcos Pérez Jiménez. 
There is currently very little data on who wrote the story.

References 

1950s Venezuelan television series
Venezuelan telenovelas
Venevisión telenovelas
Spanish-language telenovelas
Spanish-language television shows
1953 Venezuelan television series debuts